Collinsville Historic District may refer to:

Collinsville Historic District (Collinsville, Alabama), listed on the NRHP in Alabama
Collinsville Historic District (Collinsville, Connecticut), listed on the NRHP in Connecticut